The 2014 Circuito Nova Schin Stock Car Brasil season was the thirty-sixth season of the Stock Car Brasil.

Teams and drivers

Team changes
Stock Car Brasil driver Júlio Campos and businessman Edson Casagrande purchased the vacancies of Gramacho team and created a new team called the C2 Team. The team also switched manufacturers from Peugeot to Chevrolet.
Shell Racing return to Chevrolet after two seasons with Peugeot.
After ten season of partnership, Officer group and ProGP break up. Duda Pamplona owner of ProGP still in the series and Officer group left the championship.
Ricardo Zonta's team RZ Motorsport lost the BMC Group as its principal sponsor and returned to its official name in 2014.

Driver changes
Gabriel Casagrande and Diego Nunes joined the new C2 Team from RC3 Bassani, replacing 2013 Gramacho driver Rodrigo Pimenta.
Alceu Feldmann switched from Full Time Sports to Hanier Racing.
Bia Figueiredo and Rafael Suzuki joined ProGP, replacing Duda Pamplona and Ricardo Sperafico. Figueiredo had previously raced in the IndyCar Series and Suzuki in the International GT Open series
Felipe Fraga and Luciano Burti joined Vogel Motosport. Fraga was champion in the second tier Campeonato Brasileiro de Turismo series in 2013 and Burti left Boettger Competições.
Fábio Fogaça left Vogel Motorsport to race for the Schin Racing Team, replacing David Muffato.
Vitor Genz and Felipe Tozzo joined Boettger Competições; Genz joined from Gramacho Competições and Tozzo will make his debut in the series. The drivers replaced Lico Kaesemodel at the team.
Allam Khodair left Vogel Motorsport team to return to Full Time Sports; he had competed with the team in 2009 and 2010 already.
Felipe Lapenna left the Hanier Racing team to join Hot Car Competições, replacing Wellington Justino.
David Muffato, Duda Pamplona and Rodrigo Sperafico had been due to leave the series for 2014, but were later confirmed for the first round.
Antônio Pizzonia returned to the series with Prati-Donaduzzi, replacing Rodrigo Sperafico.

Mid-season changes
 Lico Kaesemodel returned for the second round with Boettger Competições, replacing Felipe Tozzo for selected races. At the fifth round Wellington Justino replaced Tozzo.
 Kaesemodel replaced Beto Cavaleiro at the Hanier Racing team for the Curitiba round.
 Stock Car Brasil second tier driver Mauri Zacarelli entered the series in the second RC3 Bassani Peugeot at Cascavel. After one round with Boettger Competições, Justino made his return at Bassani for the Curitiba round. Honda Brasileiro de Marcas driver Vicente Orige made his début with Bassani at Velopark. In Taruma Felipe Gama return to Stock with Bassani after eight seasons.

Race calendar and results
The provisional 2014 schedule was announced on 6 December 2013 with the track of sixth edition of Stock Car Corrida do Milhão held on August 8 to be announced; the season was contested over twenty-one races at twelve rounds, with the first round at Interlagos being contested by two-driver entries with wildcard drivers. The 2014 official calendar was announced on 20 March, without the Ribeirão Preto Street Circuit on the calendar. It was later confirmed that the renovated Autódromo Internacional Ayrton Senna in Goiânia would host the sixth edition of the Stock Car Corrida do Milhão. A revised calendar was announced on May 7 with the return of Ribeirão Preto and Curitiba to hold the final round. In August Ribeirão Preto was again removed from the calendar, with another Santa Cruz round added in its place. All races were held in Brazil.

Championship standings
Points system
Points were awarded for each race at an event, to the driver/s of a car that completed at least 75% of the race distance and was running at the completion of the race, up to a maximum of 48 points per event.

Dual Race: Used for the first round with Wildcard drivers.
Feature races: Used for the first race of each event and the Stock Car Million race.
Sprint races: Used for the second race of each event, with partially reversed (top ten) grid.
Final race: Used for the last round of the season with double points.

Drivers' Championship

Teams' Championship

Footnotes

References

External links
  

Stock Car Brasil seasons
Stock Car Brasil season